Lukas Gabbichler (born 12 May 1998) is an Austrian footballer who plays for Grazer AK.

References

Living people
1998 births
Association football midfielders
Austrian footballers
SC Weiz players
TSV Hartberg players
Grazer AK players
Austrian Football Bundesliga players